North Carolina's 45th Senate district is one of 50 districts in the North Carolina Senate. It has been represented by Republican Dean Proctor since 2023.

Geography
Since 2023, the district has included all of Catawba County, as well as part of Caldwell County. The district overlaps with the 87th, 89th, and 96th state house districts.

District officeholders since 2003

Election results

2022

2020

2018

2016

2014

2012

2010

2008

2006

2004

2002

References

North Carolina Senate districts
Catawba County, North Carolina
Caldwell County, North Carolina